The following is a partial list of monuments and memorials to Robert E. Lee, who served as General in Chief of the Armies of the Confederate States in 1865. At the end is a listing of monuments and memorials to Lee that have been removed or renamed.

Buildings
 Arlington House, The Robert E. Lee Memorial (U.S. National; Arlington, Virginia)
 Lee Chapel (Lexington, Virginia)- now called University Chapel.
 R. E. Lee Memorial Episcopal Church (Lexington, Virginia) Episcopal Diocese of Southwestern Virginia - On September 18, 2017, the church's vestry voted to return the name of the church back to Grace Episcopal Church.
 Robert E. Lee Building / Hotel (Jackson, Mississippi)
 Robert E. Lee Hotel changed to The Gin in 2020 (Lexington, Virginia)
 Robert E. Lee Inn (Morgan, New Jersey)
 Robert E. Lee Theater (Baton Rouge, Louisiana)

Holidays and events
 Lee–Jackson Day
 Robert E. Lee Day

Military facilities
 Fort Lee, Virginia (1917)
 Lee Barracks at U.S. Military Academy at West Point, New York (1962)

Monuments and sculptures
 Gen. Robert E. Lee, C.S.A. historical marker (Tampa, Florida)
 Gen. Robert E. Lee historical marker (Hagerstown, Maryland)
 Gen. Robert E. Lee historical marker (Pickens, South Carolina)
 General Robert E. Lee historical marker (Fort Hamilton) (Brooklyn, New York)
 General Robert E. Lee historical marker (Yemassee, South Carolina)
 Lee Highway historical marker (Roanoke, Virginia)
 Robert E. Lee bust on Confederate Monument (Paris, Texas)
 Robert E. Lee bust in the Hall of Fame for Great Americans outdoor sculpture gallery at the Bronx Community College (The Bronx, New York City), removed 17 August 2017
 Robert E. Lee Dixie Highway Historical Markers
 in Franklin, Ohio
 near Tennessee/North Carolina state line between Newport, Tennessee and Hot Springs, North Carolina
 in Hot Springs, North Carolina
 in Marshall, North Carolina
 in Asheville, North Carolina
 in Fletcher, North Carolina
 in Hendersonville, North Carolina
 near North Carolina/South Carolina state line
 in Greenville, South Carolina
 near Bradfordville, Florida
 Robert E. Lee Bridge Historical Marker (Richmond, Virginia)
 Robert E. Lee Memorial Highway marker (Columbia, South Carolina)
 Robert E. Lee memorial marker (Fort Myers, Florida)
 Robert E. Lee memorial marker (St. Louis, Missouri)
 Robert E. Lee Monument (Marianna, Arkansas), listed on the National Register of Historic Places (NRHP)
 Robert E. Lee Monument (New Orleans, Louisiana), NRHP-listed; removed May 2017
 Robert Edward Lee Sculpture (Charlottesville, Virginia), NRHP-listed (removed by the city in July 2021, stored in an undisclosed location)
 Robert E. Lee Monument (Richmond, Virginia), NRHP-listed (removed on 8 September 2021 at the direction of the state government.
 Robert E. Lee, Virginia Monument (Gettysburg, Pennsylvania)
 Robert E. Lee on Traveller, in Turtle Creek Park (formerly Robert E. Lee Park), Dallas, Texas, from 1936 to 2017
 Robert E. Lee and Stonewall Jackson Monument (Baltimore, Maryland), removed August 16, 2017
 Robert E. Lee Monument (Durham, North Carolina), statue in the Duke University Chapel; installed in the 1930s in consultation with "an unnamed Vanderbilt University professor"; defaced August 17, 2017; removed August 19, 2017
 Robert E. Lee Monument, Antietam National Battlefield (Washington County, Maryland), dedicated June 24, 2003
 Robert E. Lee Statue, Confederate War Memorial (Dallas) removed June 2020
 Robert E. Lee Statue, South Mall, University of Texas (Austin, Texas), dedicated 1933, removed August 20–21, 2017 (along with statues of General Albert Sidney Johnston and Confederate Postmaster John H. Reagan)
 Robert E. Lee statue and historical marker (Richmond Hill, Georgia)
 Robert E. Lee Tree historical marker (Brooklyn, New York), removed 16 August, 2017 by Episcopal Diocese of Long Island

Parks
 Robert E. Lee Memorial Park (Baltimore, Maryland) – Renamed on 28 September 2015 to Lake Roland Park.
 Robert E. Lee Park (Dallas, Texas) – Monument was removed by Dallas City Council, 2018. Park was renamed Turtle Creek Park.

Roads
 General Lee Avenue (Fort Hamilton) (Brooklyn, New York) – New York Governor Andrew Cuomo has called for it to be renamed.
 General Robert E. Lee Circle (Spanish Fort, Alabama)
 General Robert E. Lee Road (Brunswick, Georgia)
 General Robert E. Lee Street (Stanley, North Carolina)
 Lee Avenue (Manassas, Virginia)
 Lee Boulevard (Richland, Washington) (Lee Blvd. historical marker on a corner of the road across from Richland High School)
 Lee Circle (New Orleans, Louisiana)
 Lee Drive (Baton Rouge, Louisiana)
 Lee Drive (Clarksdale, Mississippi)
 Lee Highway (former national auto trail)
 Lee-Jackson Memorial Highway (Fairfax County, Virginia)
 Lee Parkway (Dallas, Texas)
 Lee Road (Fairview Shores, Florida)
 Lee Road (Fort Myers, Florida)
 Lee Road (Macon, Georgia)
 Lee Street (Dallas, Texas)
 Lee Street (Hollywood, Florida) – Renamed Liberty Street in 2018.
 Lee Street (Blacksburg, Virginia)
 Lee Street (Warrenton, Virginia)
 Robert E. Lee Avenue (Elkins, West Virginia)
 Robert E. Lee Avenue (Timmonsville, South Carolina)
 Robert E. Lee Avenue (Waynesboro, Virginia)
 Robert E. Lee Boulevard (Bossier City, Louisiana)
 Robert E. Lee Boulevard (Charleston, South Carolina)
 Robert E. Lee Boulevard (Drummonds, Tennessee)
 Robert E. Lee Boulevard (Estero, Florida)
 Robert E. Lee Boulevard (James Island, South Carolina)
 Robert E. Lee Boulevard (New Orleans, Louisiana), will be renamed February 1st, 2022
 Robert E. Lee Boulevard (Stone Mountain, Georgia)
 Robert E. Lee Boulevard (Vicksburg, Mississippi)
 Robert E. Lee Boulevard (Columbus, Georgia)
 Robert E. Lee Court (Nashville, Tennessee)
 Robert E. Lee Drive (Bristow, Virginia)
 Robert E. Lee Drive (Conroe, Texas)
 Robert E. Lee Drive (Flat Rock, Henderson County, North Carolina)
 Robert E. Lee Drive (Greenwood, Mississippi)
 Robert E. Lee Drive (Hopewell, Virginia)
 Robert E. Lee Drive (Jesup, Georgia)
 Robert E. Lee Drive (Killeen, Texas)
 Robert E. Lee Drive (Manchester, Tennessee)
 Robert E. Lee Drive (Marlin, Texas)
 Robert E. Lee Drive (Millbrook, Alabama)
 Robert E. Lee Drive (Nashville, Tennessee)
 Robert E. Lee Drive (Natural Bridge Station, Virginia)
 Robert E. Lee Drive (Newport, Tennessee)
 Robert E. Lee Drive (Odum, Georgia)
 Robert E. Lee Drive (Spotsylvania, Virginia)
 Robert E. Lee Drive (Tupelo, Mississippi)
 Robert E. Lee Drive (Tyler, Texas)
 Robert E. Lee Drive (Walterboro, South Carolina)
 Robert E. Lee Drive (Willard, North Carolina)
 Robert E. Lee Drive (Wilmington, North Carolina)
 Robert E. Lee Drive (Cincinnati, Ohio)
 Robert E. Lee Lane (Brentwood, Tennessee)
 Robert E. Lee Lane (Gila Bend, Arizona)
 Robert E. Lee Lane (Macclenny, Florida)
 Robert E. Lee Lane (Steamboat Springs, Colorado)
 Robert E. Lee Memorial Bridge (Richmond, Virginia)
 Robert E. Lee Parkway (Jonesboro, Georgia)
 Robert E. Lee Road (Austin, Texas) – Renamed Azie Morton Road.
 Robert E. Lee Road (Deridder, Louisiana)
 Robert E. Lee Road (El Paso, Texas) - Renamed Buffalo Soldier Road in 2020. 
 Robert E. Lee Road (Hattiesburg, Mississippi)
 Robert E. Lee Road (Houston, Texas)
 Robert E. Lee Road (Hunt, Texas)
 Robert E. Lee Road (Lucedale, Mississippi)
 Robert E. Lee Road (Powhatan, Virginia)
 Robert E. Lee Road (Reeds Spring, Missouri)
 Robert E. Lee Road (Tampa, Florida)
 Robert E. Lee Street (Andersonville, Georgia)
 Robert E. Lee Street (El Dorado, Arkansas)
 Robert E. Lee Street (Leeds, Alabama)
 Robert E. Lee Street (Malvern, Arkansas)
 Robert E. Lee Street (Mobile, Alabama)
 Robert E. Lee Street (Oglethorpe, Georgia)
 Robert E. Lee Street (Phoenix, Arizona)
 Robert E. Lee Way (Eufaula, Alabama)
 Robert Lee Court (Huntsville, Alabama)
 Robert Lee Lane (New Braunfels, Texas)
 Robert Lee Lane (Smyrna, Tennessee)
 Robert Lee Road (Trussville, Alabama)

Schools

 East Lee County High School (Lehigh Acres, Florida)
 Lee County High School (Marianna, Arkansas)
 Lee County High School (Beattyville, Kentucky)
 Lee County High School (Sanford, North Carolina)
 Lee-Davis High School (Mechanicsville, Virginia) – Renamed Mechanicsville High School following the George Floyd protests
 Lee-Scott Academy (Auburn, Alabama)
 Robert E. Lee Academy (Bishopville, South Carolina)
 Robert E. Lee Elementary Magnet School of World Studies & Technology (Tampa, Florida)
 Robert E. Lee Elementary School (Abilene, Texas)
 Robert E. Lee Elementary School (Amarillo, Texas)
 Robert E. Lee Elementary School (Austin, Texas) – Renamed Russell Lee Elementary in 2016.
 Robert E. Lee Elementary School (Columbia, Missouri)
 Robert E. Lee Elementary School (East Dallas, Dallas, Texas) – Renamed Geneva Heights Elementary School beginning with the 2018-2019 school year.
 Robert E. Lee Elementary School (Denton, Texas)
 Robert E. Lee Elementary School (Durant, Oklahoma)
 Robert E. Lee Elementary School (Eagle Pass, Texas)
 Robert E. Lee Elementary School (East Wenatchee, Washington) – Renamed Lee Elementary in 2018.
 Robert E. Lee Elementary School (El Paso, Texas) - Renamed Sunrise Mountain Elementary School in 2020. 
 Robert E. Lee Elementary School (Grand Prairie, Texas)
 Robert E. Lee Elementary School (Hampton, Virginia) (closed in 2010)
 Robert E. Lee High School (Houston) - Now Wisdom High School
 Robert E. Lee Elementary School (Hugo, Oklahoma)
 Robert E. Lee Elementary School (Jackson, Mississippi)
 Robert E. Lee Elementary School (Long Beach, California) – Renamed Olivia Herrera Elementary School on August 1, 2016.
 Robert E. Lee Elementary School (Marshall, Texas)
 Robert E. Lee Elementary School (Richmond, Virginia)
 Robert E. Lee Elementary School (San Diego, California) – Renamed Pacific View Leadership Elementary School on May 22, 2016.
 Robert E. Lee Elementary School (Satsuma, Alabama)
 Robert E. Lee Elementary School (Spotsylvania, Virginia)
 Robert E. Lee Elementary School (Springdale, Arkansas)
 Robert E. Lee Elementary School (Tullahoma, Tennessee)
 Robert E. Lee Elementary School (Tulsa, Oklahoma)
 Robert E. Lee Junior High School (Monroe, Louisiana)
 Robert E. Lee Middle School (Fairview Shores, Florida)
 Robert E. Lee Middle School (Orlando, Florida) - Renamed College Park Middle School in 2017
 Robert E. Lee Middle School (San Angelo, Texas)
 Robert E. Lee High School (Montgomery, Alabama)
 Robert E. Lee High School (Jacksonville), Florida- in August, to become Riverside High School.
 Robert E. Lee High School (Baytown, Texas)
 Robert E. Lee High School (Midland, Texas) - Renamed Legacy High School
 Robert E. Lee High School (San Antonio, Texas) - Renamed Legacy of Educational Excellence (LEE) High School prior to the 2018-19 school year.
 Robert E. Lee High School (Tyler, Texas) - renamed Tyler Legacy High School in 2020. 
 Robert E. Lee High School (Fairfax County, Virginia) - Now John R. Lewis High School
 Robert E. Lee High School (Staunton, Virginia) - Renamed to Staunton High School on July 1, 2019.
 Robert Lee High School (Robert Lee, Texas)
 Southern Lee High School (Sanford, North Carolina)
 Upson-Lee High School (Thomaston, Georgia)
 Washington-Lee High School (Arlington, Virginia) – Renamed Washington-Liberty High School beginning with the 2019–20 school year.
 Robert E. Lee Intermediate (Gainesville, Texas)

Settlements
 Fort Lee (Virginia)
 Leesville, Louisiana
 Relee, Georgia
 Robert Lee, Texas

Ships
 , a Confederate States Navy blockade runner
 Robert E. Lee (steamboat), a famous steamboat, built in 1866, usually travelling New Orleans–Natchez, Mississippi.
 , an Eastern Steamship Lines ship sunk by German submarine U-166 in 1942
 , a former (scrapped) United States Navy fleet ballistic missile submarine

Universities and colleges
 Lee College, Baytown, Texas
 Washington and Lee University, Lexington, Virginia

U.S. counties
 Lee County, Alabama
 Lee County, Arkansas
 Lee County, Florida
 Lee County, Kentucky
 Lee County, Mississippi
 Lee County, North Carolina
 Lee County, South Carolina
 Lee County, Texas

Vehicles
 M3 Lee
 General Lee (car)

Removed and renamed monuments and memorials to Lee, by state
 California
 Long Beach: Robert E. Lee Elementary School, renamed Olivia Herrera Elementary School on August 1, 2016.
 San Diego: Robert E. Lee Elementary School, renamed Pacific View Leadership Elementary School on May 22, 2016.
 District of Columbia
 Washington: 
In 2017, Washington National Cathedral removed stained glass windows honoring Robert E. Lee and Stonewall Jackson.
In 2020, United States Capitol removed a statue of Robert E. Lee.
 Florida
 Fort Myers: The bust of Robert E. Lee, on a pedestal in the median of Monroe Street downtown, was found face down on the ground on March 12, 2019; the bolts holding it in place had been removed. It did not appear to be damaged, and was removed by the Sons of Confederate Veterans, whose defunct Laetitia Ashmore Nutt Chapter had commissioned it in 1996 from Italian sculptor Aldo Pero for $6,000. In 2018 there had been conflict over the future of the monument, both at a Ft. Myers City Council meeting and at the monument itself.
 Hollywood: Lee Street was renamed Liberty Street in 2018. Streets in honor of Confederate heroes Nathan Bedford Forrest and John Bell Hood were also renamed.
 Georgia: In 2015 the Georgia legislature removed the name of Robert E. Lee Day; it is now known as a "State Holiday."
 Athens: A portrait of Robert E. Lee was removed from a building on the campus of the University of Georgia by the Demosthenian Literary Society.
 Louisiana
 Baton Rouge
 Robert E. Lee High School, now Liberty Magnet High School.
 New Orleans
 Robert E. Lee Monument (New Orleans, Louisiana), removed in May 2017.
 Maryland
 Baltimore
 Robert E. Lee and Stonewall Jackson Monument,  removed August 16, 2017.
 Robert E. Lee Memorial Park, renamed Lake Roland Park on 28 September 2015.
 New York
 New York City (Brooklyn): The Robert E. Lee Tree historical marker was removed 16 August, 2017, by the Episcopal Diocese of Long Island.
 New York City (Bronx): The Robert E. Lee bust in the Hall of Fame for Great Americans outdoor sculpture gallery at Bronx Community College was removed on 17 August 2017, along with the statue of Stonewall Jackson.
 North Carolina
 Durham: Statue of Robert E. Lee in the Duke University Chapel. Defaced August 17, 2017; removed August 19, 2017.

 Texas
 Austin
 Robert E. Lee Elementary School, renamed Russell Lee Elementary in 2016.
 Robert E. Lee Road, renamed Azie Morton Road in 2019.
Robert E. Lee Statue, South Mall, University of Texas (Austin, Texas). Dedicated 1933. Removed August 20–21, 2017, along with statues of General Albert Sidney Johnston and Confederate Postmaster John H. Reagan. Placed in a museum.
 Dallas
Robert E. Lee Elementary School, renamed Geneva Heights Elementary School beginning with the 2018-2019 school year.
Robert E. Lee Statue, in Robert E. Lee Park. Removed by Dallas City Council, 2018. Park was renamed Turtle Creek Park.
El Paso
Robert E. Lee Elementary School, renamed Sunrise Mountain Elementary School in 2020.
Robert E. Lee Road, renamed Buffalo Soldier Road in 2020.
Midland
Robert E. Lee High School, renamed Legacy High School in 2020.
San Antonio
 Robert E. Lee High School, renamed Legacy of Educational Excellence (LEE) High School starting in the 2018-19 school year.
Tyler
 Robert E. Lee High School, renamed Legacy High School in 2020.
 Virginia
 Lexington: In 2017, the name of the R. E. Lee Memorial Episcopal Church (Lexington, Virginia) was returned to its original name of Grace Episcopal Church.
 Richmond: the equestrian statue of Lee on Monument Avenue was removed on 8 September 2021 at the direction of the state government.
 Washington
East Wenatchee: Robert E. Lee Elementary School, renamed Lee Elementary in 2018.

References

Memorials, Lee, Robert